Willerding is a surname. Notable people with this surname include:

Hans-Joachim Willerding (born 1952), German politician
Margaret Willerding (1919–2003), American mathematician
Ulrich Willerding (born 1932), German botanist